Moelfryn is a small village in the community of Dyffryn Arth, Ceredigion, Wales, which is 65.4 miles (105.2 km) from Cardiff and 176.2 miles (283.5 km) from London. Moelfryn is represented in the Senedd by Elin Jones (Plaid Cymru) and is part of the Ceredigion constituency in the House of Commons.

References

See also 
 List of localities in Wales by population

Villages in Ceredigion